John Milton Sandidge (January 7, 1817 – March 30, 1890) was a U.S. Representative from Louisiana.

Biography
Born near Carnesville, Georgia, Sandidge moved to Louisiana and became a planter.
He served as colonel in the Mexican War.
He served as member of the State house of representatives 1846-1855 and served two years as speaker.
He served as delegate to the State constitutional convention in 1852.

Sandidge was elected as a Democrat to the Thirty-fourth and Thirty-fifth Congresses (March 4, 1855 – March 3, 1859).
He served as chairman of the Committee on Private Land Claims (Thirty-fifth Congress).

He served throughout the Civil War as Colonel of Bossier Cavalry. When Brigadier General Henry Watkins Allen was made Governor of Louisiana, he called Colonel Sandidge to his staff as Chief of Ordnance, the position he held until the close of hostilities. Sandidge surrendered the archives of the State by special request of Governor Allen. Sons, James and George Sandidge served in the Confederate Army.

He died in Bastrop, Louisiana, on March 30, 1890, and was interred in Christ Church Cemetery.

Notes

References

1817 births
1890 deaths
Speakers of the Louisiana House of Representatives
Democratic Party members of the Louisiana House of Representatives
American planters
Confederate States Army officers
People from Carnesville, Georgia
Democratic Party members of the United States House of Representatives from Louisiana
19th-century American politicians